St. Vincent's High School is a private Catholic primary and secondary school and pre-university college for boys located in the city of Pune, Maharashtra, India. The English-medium convent school was founded by the Jesuits in 1867, located and is named in honour of Vincent de Paul, a seventeenth-century saint known for his love for the poor and the downtrodden. The school, which is recognized by the Government of Maharashtra, prepares pupils for the Secondary School Certificate Examination (Std. X) and for the Higher Secondary Certificate examination (Std. XII).

Management  
It is owned by the Poona Catholic Educational Association and managed by the Poona Jesuit School's Society, which belong to the Christian Religious Minority group, and therefore it enjoys the rights and privileges guaranteed by Article 30 (I) of the Constitution of India. It is considered one of the best schools in Pune and provides quality education to the students.  it was ranked at No. 9 of all boys' schools in India. The Society of Jesus, to which the Jesuit Fathers and Brothers belong, is a Catholic religious order founded by St. Ignatius of Loyola in 1540. Active in the field of education throughout the world since its origin, the Society runs 179 high schools and 98 colleges in India, in which young people of every social class, community, and linguistic group are educated through the medium of both English and the regional languages.

Curriculum and facilities 
St. Vincent's High School imparts English-medium education from Std.I to Std.X. The St. Vincent's Junior College prepares students for the Higher Secondary Certificate Examination. The St. Xavier's pre-primary school prepares children to study English. Admissions are competitive, based on merit. The plans on making an Olympic sized swimming pool in the campus has been achieved. The massive school football ground is just the exact size of a real football field along with a stadium to suit the audiences.

Co-curriculum activities 

St. Vincent's has the notable record of winning the PSAA's (Poona Schools Athletics Association) Annual Athletics Championship for 60 consecutive years as of 6 February 2007. This achievement was recorded as a national record in the Limca Book of Records.

Principals
The following individuals have served as principal of St. Vincent's High School:

Notable alumni

 Ebrahim Alkazitheatre director and Padma Vibhushan
 Banoo Jehangir Coyajithe first female to matriculate from St Vincent's, an all-boys school, in 1933
 Merwan Sheriar Iranian Indian spiritual master
 Thomas Kailathan electrical engineer, information theorist, control engineer, entrepreneur and the Hitachi America Professor of Engineering, Emeritus, at Stanford University

See also

 List of Jesuit schools
 List of schools in Pune
 Violence against Christians in India

References

External links

 Vincents Old Boys Association (VOBA) Official alumni organization
 VincentiDabitur.com Website for ex-Vincentians

Jesuit secondary schools in India
Jesuit primary schools in India
Schools in Colonial India
High schools and secondary schools in Maharashtra
Private schools in Maharashtra
Christian schools in Maharashtra
Schools in Pune
Educational institutions established in 1867
1867 establishments in India